The Yivli Minaret Mosque (lit. "Fluted Minaret" Mosque), also known as the Alaaddin Mosque or simply Grand Mosque, in Antalya is a historical mosque built by the Anatolian Seljuk Sultan Kay Qubadh I. It is part of a külliye (complex of structures) which includes the Gıyaseddin Keyhüsrev Medrese, Seljuk and Dervish lodge, and the vaults of Zincirkıran and Nigar Hatun. The mosque is located in Kaleiçi (the old town centre) along Cumhuriyet Caddesi, next to Kalekapısı Meydanı. The mosque's fluted minaret called the Yivli Minare, which is decorated with dark blue tiles, is a landmark and symbol of the city.  In 2016 it was inscribed in the Tentative list of World Heritage Sites in Turkey.

History 
The mosque was first built in 1230 and fully reconstructed for the second time in 1373.

The first building (1230) was built around 1225-7, during the reign of the Seljuk sultan Ala ad-Din Kay Qubadh I (1220-1237). The original mosque was destroyed in the 14th century and a new mosque was built in 1373 by the Hamidids on the foundation of a Byzantine church. With its six domes, it is one of the oldest examples of multi-dome construction in Anatolia.

Today the building houses the Antalya Ethnographic Museum and contains clothing, kitchen utensils, embroidery, tapestries and looms, socks, sacks, kilims, ornaments, and nomadic tents. It was opened to the public in 1974.

See also
 List of Turkish Grand Mosques

Notes

References

163

External links

  
 Pictures of the mosque 
 

Buildings and structures in Antalya
Anatolian Beyliks architecture
Tourist attractions in Antalya
History of Antalya Province
Mosques in Antalya
14th-century mosques
Muratpaşa District
Religious buildings and structures completed in 1373
World Heritage Tentative List for Turkey
Mosques completed in 1230